This is a list of garden squares, broadly defined, in London, England. Unlike the list at Squares in London, which partially overlaps, these places all have a clear communal garden element and may be named other than Square; commonly in order, Gardens, Crescent, Place, Fields and Circus reflecting the diversity of the city's complex street layout.  Non-square instances are only in this list if strongly, inherently notable for architecture, use or size – a common selectivity in the study of the history and use of such spaces.

The list deliberately avoids many similar public greens, verges and crescents outside of Central London. So too the few large public green places (Common or Park) away from the City which are not shrouded by six-foot (or more) walls even if faced conspicuously by buildings.

Some officially named Squares (streets and/or spaces) in London are triangular or a circle (circus). For instance Walcot and Wilton Squares are triangular, Hanover Square is an oval as to the garden, many are very elongated rectangles such as Bryanston Square — thus the London internal communal garden or park fronted by buildings, is not confined to squares of the main dictionary definition. Truest garden squares meet the recognisable criteria of a shared internal zone, faced chiefly by buildings' fronts having one or more open approach ways, so are not beholden to legal name nor precise shape.

Garden courtyards are commonly omitted from this list, for having been intuitively named 'Gardens' or 'Garden Apartments', or for a communal garden which is not large enough to meet traditional definitions of garden squares and so is unlikely to open for open-day visits.

Several items at List of Squares in London, a list of places named "... Square", have lost a shared hemmed-in zone with multi-estate neighbouring buildings, removing their square status, and making them town squares, remnants in name only, or private courtyards.

Barnet 
 Central Square
 Litchfield Square
 Lucas Square

Brent 
 Cambridge Square

Bromley 
 Watermen's Square

Camden 
 Argyle Square
 Bedford Square
 Bloomsbury Square
 Brunswick Square
 Camden Square
 Coram's Fields
 Chalcot Square
 Euston Square
 Gainsborough Gardens
 Gordon Square
 Gray's Inn Square
 Grove Terrace Squares
 Harrington Square
 Mecklenburgh Square
 Mornington Crescent, London
 Munster Square
 Oakley Square
 Pond Square
 Queen Square, London
 Red Lion Square
 Regent Square
 Russell Square
 South Grove Square
 Tavistock Square
 Torrington Square
 Woburn Square

City of London 
 Aldermanbury Square
 Bunhill Fields (within London Borough of Islington)
 Devonshire Square
 Finsbury Circus
 Gough Square
 Monkwell Square
 Paternoster Square
 Salisbury Square
 Warwick Square

Hackney 
 Albion Square
 Charles Square, Hackney
 Clapton Square
 De Beauvoir Square
 Fassett Square
 Goldsmith's Square
 London Fields
 Hoxton Square
 St Thomas's Square
 Town Hall Square, Hackney

Hammersmith & Fulham 
 Brompton Park
 Brook Green
 Colehill Gardens
 Imperial Square
 Lillie Square
 Queen's Club Gardens
 St Peter's Square, London
 Weaver's Terrace
 Westcroft Square

Islington 
 Alwyne Square
 Anderson Square
 Arlington Square
 Arundel Square
 Barnsbury Square
 Bartholomew Square
 Canonbury Square
 Charterhouse Square
 Claremont Square
 Cloudesley Square
 Edward Square
 Finsbury Square
 Gibson Square
 Granville Square
 King Square
 Lloyd Square
 Lonsdale Square
 Milner Square
 Myddelton Square
 Northampton Square
 Percy Square
 Thornhill Square
 Tibberton Square
 Union Square, Islington
 Vernon Square
 Wilmington Square
 Wilton Square

Kensington and Chelsea 
 Arundel Gardens
 Ashburn Place
 Barkston Gardens
 Bina Gardens
 Blenheim Crescent
 The Boltons
 Bolton Gardens
 Bramham Gardens
 Cadogan Place
 Cadogan Square
 Cambridge Gardens
 Collingham Gardens
 Colville Gardens
 Colville Square
 Courtfield Gardens
 Earl's Court Square
 Edwardes Square
 Egerton Gardens
 Elgin Crescent
 Elm Park Gardens
 Ennismore Gardens
 Gledhow Gardens
 Harrington Gardens
 Hans Place
 Hereford Square
 Kensington Square
 Kensington Park Gardens
 Lansdowne Crescent, London
 Lennox Gardens
 Lowndes Square
 Nevern Square
 Markham Square
 Onslow Square
 Paultons Square
 Pelham Crescent
 Pembridge Square
 Pembroke Square
 Philbeach Gardens
 Princes Gardens, London
 Powis Square
 Queen's Gate Gardens
 Redcliffe Square
 Royal Crescent, London
 Sloane Square
 Stanley Gardens and Stanley Crescent, Holland Park
 Stanhope Gardens
 St James's Gardens
 Tavistock Crescent
 Thurloe Square
 Warwick Square
 Wellington Square
 Wetherby Gardens

Kingston upon Thames 
 St Andrew's Square, Kingston upon Thames

Lambeth 
 Albert Square, Lambeth
 Bonnington Square
 Cleaver Square
 Courtenay Square
 Denny Crescent
 Grafton Square
 Walcot Square
 St Mary's Gardens
 Becondale Road

Southwark 
 Addington Square
 Avondale Square
 Camberwell Green
 Leyton Square
 Merrick Square
 Nelson Square
 Surrey Square Park
 Trinity Church Square
 West Square

Tower Hamlets 
 Arbour Square
 Arnold Circus, the Boundary Estate
 Beaumont Square
 Carlton Square
 Ford Square
 Ion Square
 Sidney Square
 Tredegar Square
 Trinity Square, Tower Hamlets
 York Square

Wandsworth 
 Nightingale Square
 Park Crescent, London
 St Philip Square

Westminster 
 Berkeley Square
 Belgrave Square
 Bryanston Square
 Cavendish Square
 Cambridge Square
 Chester Square
 Craven Hill Gardens
 Dolphin Square
 Dorset Square
 Eaton Square
 Ebury Square
 Eccleston Square
 Gloucester Square
 Golden Square
 Grosvenor Square
 Hanover Square, London
 Hyde Park Square
 Leicester Square
 Lincoln's Inn Fields
 Manchester Square
 Millbank Gardens
 Montagu Square
 Norfolk Square
 Oxford Square
 Park Square, London
 Parliament Square
 Porchester Square
 Portman Square
 Soho Square
 St George's Square
 St James's Square
 Smith Square
 Sussex Square Gardens
 Trafalgar Square
 Victoria Square, London
 Vincent Square, London
 Warwick Square
 Wilton Crescent

See also 
 London Squares and Enclosures (Preservation) Act 1906
 Royal Commission on London Squares
 London Squares Preservation Act 1931
 Roosevelt Memorial Act 1946

References

External links 
 http://www.londongardenstrust.org/history/squares.htm

Garden squares